The John and Helen Moore House is a historic house near Moro, Oregon, United States. It is an excellent example of the rural expression of the Italianate style in residential construction. Built in 1882, around the time of the first large-scale settlement of what became Sherman County, it is also one of the oldest houses in the county, and the only Italianate house in the region.

The house was listed on the National Register of Historic Places in 1994.

See also
National Register of Historic Places listings in Sherman County, Oregon

References

External links

1882 establishments in Oregon
Houses in Sherman County, Oregon
Houses completed in 1882
Houses on the National Register of Historic Places in Oregon
Italianate architecture in Oregon
National Register of Historic Places in Sherman County, Oregon